Michał Horodecki (born 1973) is a Polish physicist at the University of Gdańsk working in the field of quantum information theory, notable for his work on entanglement theory.

He co-discovered the Peres-Horodecki criterion for testing whether a state is entangled, and used it to find bound entanglement together with his brother Paweł Horodecki and father Ryszard Horodecki. He co-discovered with Jonathan Oppenheim, Paweł Horodecki and Karol Horodecki that secret key can be drawn from some bound entangled states. Together with Fernando Brandao he proved that every one-dimensional quantum state with a finite correlation length obeys an area law for entanglement entropy. Together with Jonathan Oppenheim and Andreas Winter, he discovered quantum state-merging and used this primitive to show that quantum information could be negative.

Papers

References

1973 births
Living people
21st-century Polish physicists
Quantum physicists
Academic staff of the University of Gdańsk